"Downhill Lullaby" is a song by American singer Sky Ferreira, released on March 27, 2019, as the lead single from her upcoming second studio album, Masochism. It also was featured on the soundtrack for Promising Young Woman. It is her first original material and single since 2014's "I Blame Myself".

Background
After various delays for new music spanning several years, Ferreira began hinting at an upcoming album in November 2018. In early March 2019, she stated on Twitter that the first song to be released from the album "is not a pop song".

Composition
In writing the track, Ferreira explained that she aimed to capture the sound of "the birds in Snow White, singing underwater, while slowly being suffocated by plastic." The song was described as a "five-and-a-half-minute, goth-noir, chamber-pop piece—with strings!—that could have easily closed an episode of the revived Twin Peaks."

Promotion
Ferreira posted the cover art and announced the release date in a social media post on March 21, 2019. She also starred on the first virtual cover of Pitchfork Magazine to promote the single and her upcoming album, which has since been delayed.

Critical reception
Rolling Stone editor Brittany Spanos ranked the song as "Song You Need to Know" describing the song as "one of her finest and most melodramatic performances yet".

Year-end lists

Credits and personnel
Credits adapted from Tidal.

 Sky Ferreira – vocals, production
 Jorge Elbrecht – production, vocal bass, programming
 Rune Kielsgaard – drums
 Lars Lundholm – engineering
 Mike Bozzi – mastering
 Dean Hurley – mix engineering
 Ira Grylack – recording engineering
 Matt Neighbor – recording engineering
 Nis Bysted – recording engineering
 Nils Grøndahl – violin

References

2019 singles
2019 songs
Capitol Records singles
Sky Ferreira songs
Songs written by Sky Ferreira
Chamber pop songs
Trip hop songs